John Baptist Kaggwa (23 March 1943 – 20 January 2021) was a Ugandan Catholic prelate who was Bishop of the Diocese of Masaka, where he served as the Ordinary from 10 January 1998 until his retirement on 16 April 2019. For a period of more than three years, from 19 December 1994 until 10 January 1998, Kaggwa served as Coadjutor Bishop of Masaka, Uganda.

Background and education
He was born on 23 March 1943 at Bulenga, Busiro County, Wakiso District, in the Buganda Region of Uganda. He attended Lubaga Boys Primary School from 1952 until he completed Primary 6 in 1957. He then joined Kisubi Minor Seminary in 1958. While at Kisubi, he studied Latin. Later he studied at Katigondo Major Seminary, were he studied Philosophy.

In 1965, Archbishop Joseph Kiwanuka sent him to study at Pontifical Urban University, in Rome, on scholarship. He was ordained deacon in May 1970 in Rome. He held a Doctor of Philosophy degree in Canon Law and Secular Law, awarded by Pontifical Urban University.

Priesthood
He was ordained a priest on 12 December 1971 in Rome, at the age of 28. Following his doctoral studies, he was appointed vice-rector of the Pontifical College of St Paul, in Rome, for five years. He returned to Uganda in the 1980s and was appointed the first rector of St. Mbaaga Seminary at Ggaba.4

On 19 December 1994, he was appointed the coadjutor Bishop of Masaka. He was consecrated bishop on 24 June 1995 by his predecessor, Bishop Adrian Kivumbi Ddungu. He succeeded as Bishop of Masaka, Uganda on 10 January 1998.  Under his leadership the diocese supported development projects including the construction of new schools, homes, shops and farms.  The income from these projects helped fund the diocese and a shopping arcade was named after Kaggwa.  During his time as bishop the diocese set up its own radio station, Centenary FM.

On 6 July 2019, Kaggwa was the Principal Consecrator of his replacement, Bishop Serverus Jjumba as the Ordinary of Masaka Diocese. Kaggwa then retired as bishop but continued to work in the diocese as directed by Bishop Jjumba. Three days after his retirement Kaggwa called for private investigators to look into the murder of Brother Norbert Emmanuel Mugarura, the Superior General of the Brothers of St. Charles Lwanga religious order who was killed in university premises.

COVID-19 pandemic 
In June 2020, he asked the Ugandan government to consider postponing the 2021 Ugandan general election because of the COVID-19 pandemic. Kaggwa was concerned that with mass rallies and canvassing events replaced with virtual campaigning the electorate not be engaged. He feared the measures would favour incumbent candidates and proposed delaying the election by up to two years. At the same time Kaggwa campaigned for arcade shop-owners to be allowed to reopen, as shopping malls had been allowed to do so.

On 17 October a prayer event held by Kaggwa for members of the Mbogo Clan at Singo was raided by police and the Ugandan military. Tear gas and live bullets were used to disperse attendees. It is believed the action was related to the expected attendance of Bobi Wine, a Mbogo member, at the event. Several Wine supporters had previously been arrested by the security services. The police later apologised to the church and to Kaggwa for using tear gas during the operation.

Kaggwa died on 20 January 2021, of COVID-19, which he had first contracted two months prior during the COVID-19 pandemic in Uganda.

See also
 Cyprian Kizito Lwanga
 Uganda Martyrs

Succession table
Source:

References

External links
Human dignity, evangelization and a cow

1943 births
2021 deaths
20th-century Roman Catholic bishops in Uganda
21st-century Roman Catholic bishops in Uganda
Pontifical Urban University alumni
People from Wakiso District
Deaths from the COVID-19 pandemic in Uganda
Roman Catholic bishops of Masaka